The Needle Was Traveling is the sixth full-length release by Tarwater, an electronic music group from Berlin, Germany. The album debuted on March 22, 2005.

Track listing 
"Across the Dial"
"Stone"
"Seven of Nine"
"Entry"
"Babylonian Tower"
"TV Blood"
"The People"
"All That"
"Jackie"
"Yeah!"
"In a Single Place"
"Ninety Days"
"Unseen in the Disco"
"Home Tonight"

Lyric Origin
Many of the lyrics from The Needle Was Traveling are direct sentences that can be found in various short stories or books, with each song relating to a singular, specific story.  For example, the lyrics from "Across the Dial" can be found in Roald Dahl's "The Sound Machine," a short story in his collection Skin and Other Stories.  "Ninety Days" lyrics can be read from text in Valis, a science fiction novel written by Philip K. Dick.

External links
 The Needle Was Traveling at Discogs

2005 albums
Tarwater (band) albums
Morr Music albums